Thick Noon is the debut album from comedian Nick Thune released by Comedy Central Records on February 23, 2010. The CD contains live tracks as well studio songs. Packaged with a DVD containing various video footage. The title is a spoonerism of his name.

Track listing

CD

DVD
"Comedy Central Presents (Aired Version)"
"Comedy Central Presents (Uncut Version)"
"Nick's Big Show Episodes 1 -3"
"iThunes Short Films"

References

2010 live albums
Comedy Central Records live albums
Stand-up comedy albums
Spoken word albums by American artists
Live spoken word albums